Joseph James LaBarbera (born February 22, 1948) is an American jazz drummer and composer.  He is best known for his recordings and live performances with the trio of pianist Bill Evans in the final years of Evans's career. His older brothers are saxophonist Pat LaBarbera and trumpeter John LaBarbera.

Career 
He grew up in Mount Morris, New York. His first drum teacher was his father. For two years in the late 1960s he attended Berklee College of Music, then went on tour with singer Frankie Randall.  After Berklee he spent two years with the US Army band at Fort Dix, New Jersey. He began his professional career playing with Woody Herman and the Thundering Herd.

His reputation grew in the 1970s when he spent four years recording and touring with Chuck Mangione. He also worked as a sideman for Bob Brookmeyer, Jim Hall, Art Farmer, Art Pepper, John Scofield, Toots Thielemans, and Phil Woods. In 1979 he was a member of the Bill Evans trio, then spent much of the 1980s and early 1990s with Tony Bennett. He was in a quartet with his brother Pat and in a trio with Hein van de Geyn and John Abercrombie. He has taught at the California Institute of the Arts and the Bud Shank Jazz Workshop.

Discography

As leader
 The Joe La Barbera Quintet Live (Jazz Compass, 2001)
 Mark Time (Jazz Compass, 2003)
 Love Locked Out (2003), with Patti Wicks and Keter Betts
 Native Land (Jazz Compass, 2006)
 Silver Streams (Jazz Compass, 2012)

As sideman
With Tony Bennett
 1986 The Art of Excellence 
 1987 Bennett/Berlin
 1990 Astoria: Portrait of the Artist
 1992 Perfectly Frank
 2007 Sings the Ultimate American Songbook Vol. 1

With Rosemary Clooney
 1989 Rosemary Clooney Sings Rodgers, Hart & Hammerstein 
 1992 Girl Singer
 1997 Mothers & Daughters
 2000 The Songbook Collection
 2001 Sentimental Journey: The Girl Singer and Her New Big Band

With Bill Cunliffe
 1993 A Paul Simon Songbook
 1995 Bill in Brazi
 2001 Live at Bernie's
 2002 Bill Cunliffe Sextet: Live at Rocco
 2003 How My Heart Sings

With Bill Evans
 1979 Live at the Balboa Jazz Club, Vol. 1
 1979 Live at the Balboa Jazz Club, Vol. 2
 1979 Live at the Balboa Jazz Club, Vol. 3
 1979 Live at the Balboa Jazz Club, Vol. 4
 1979 Live at the Balboa Jazz Club, Vol. 5
 1979 Live in Buenos Aires, 1979
 1979 We Will Meet Again
 1980 Letter to Evan
 1980 Turn Out the Stars
 1983 The Paris Concert: Edition 1
 1983 The Paris Concert: Edition 2
 1996 His Last Concert in Germany
 1996 The Brilliant
 1996 Turn Out the Stars: Final Village Vanguard Recordings
 2000 The Last Waltz
 2005 Live in Rome 1979

With John LaBarbera 
 2003 On the Wild Side (Jazz Compass)
 2005 Fantazm (Jazz Compass)
 2013 Caravan (Jazz Compass)

With Pat LaBarbera
 1976 Pass It On
 1993 JMOG (Jazz Men on the Go)
 2003 Deep in a Dream
 2005 Crossing the Line

With Chuck Mangione
 1973 Land of Make Believe 
 1975 Bellavia
 1975 Chase the Clouds Away

With Bud Shank
 1996 Plays the Music of Bill Evans 
 1999 After You Jeru
 2000 Silver Storm
 2002 On the Trail
 2009 Fascinating Rhythms

With Kim Richmond
 1994 Range 
 1999 Look at the Time
 2001 Ballads

With Terry Trotter and Trotter Trio
 1993 It's About Time
 1995 A Funny Thing Happened on the Way to the Forum...In Jazz
 1995 Company...In
 1995 Stephen Sondheim's Sweeney Todd in Jazz
 1996 The Michel Legrand Album
 1997 Sketches on Star Wars
 1998 Follies
 2001 The Fantasticks in Jazz

With others
 1992 In Tribute, Diane Schuur
 1997 " All the More", Kenny Wheeler
 2003 As Time Goes By: The Great American Songbook, Volume II, Rod Stewart
 2003 Michael Bublé, Michael Bublé
 2004 Renee Olstead, Renee Olstead
 2007 Call Me Irresponsible, Michael Bublé
 2009 Skylark, Renee Olstead
 2009 Crazy Love, Michael Bublé

References 

1948 births
Living people
Musicians from New York (state)
20th-century American drummers
American jazz composers
American jazz drummers
American jazz musicians